Carla Delgado Gómez (born 13 July 1959 in Güímar, Tenerife, Canary Islands) is a Spanish actress who uses the stage name Carla Antonelli. She is also a noted LGBT rights activist who maintains a large support website for transgender people, and a politician who served in the Madrid Assembly, the first trans person to serve in a legislature in Spain.

Career
Antonelli attended the Conservatory of Music and Dramatic Arts (Conservatorio de Música y Arte Dramático) in Santa Cruz de Tenerife.

In 1980 she recorded the first documentary on transsexuality for TVE2. It was not aired until September 1981, after the failed 23-F coup by Antonio Tejero.

Antonelli is best known for her role as Gloria in the television series .

Political activism

In 1997 Antonelli joined in the Spanish Socialist Workers' Party (PSOE), as Area Coordinator for the Federal Transsexual/GLBT Group.

In 2004 the PSOE won the elections and the Congress approved gay marriage, but trans rights were not granted at that time. In 2006, Antonelli threatened a hunger strike unless the PSOE majority adopted the Gender Identity Law (Ley de Identidad de Género). The law was adopted in 2007, and she was the first transsexual person in the Community of Madrid to obtain the amended sex designation on her legal documents.

Antonelli has spoken out against attempts to prohibit sex work in Spain, noting that it would disproportionately affect trans women, who often have difficulty finding other work.

She has received several awards for her work. The Transsexual Collective of Madrid honored her in 2003 for her trailblazing efforts. She was honored by transgender groups in Catalonia and Andalusia in 2008 for her work on the Gender Identity Act. She won the 2008 Premios Látigos y Plumas from the Federación Estatal de Gays, Lesbianas y Transexuales de España and the 2009 Baeza Award (Premia Baeza) for visibility.

On 22 May 2011, Antonelli was elected on the list of the Spanish Socialist Party to the Assembly of the Community of Madrid, becoming the first trans person elected to a legislature in Spain and was re-elected in the 2015 and 2019 regional elections. Following the 2021 Madrilenian elections, she lost her seat as the PSOE failed to achieve more than 24 seats, and she was placed 35th in the electoral list.

Film and television work

 Hijos de papá (dir. Rafael Gil, 1980)
 Corridas de alegría (dir. Gonzalo García Pelayo, 1980)
 Pepe no me des tormento (dir. José María Gutiérrez, 1980)
 Las guapas y locas chicas de Ibiza (dir. Siggi Ghotz, 1981)
 Adolescencia (dir. Germán Llorente, 1982)
 Extraños (dir. Imanol Uribe, 1999)
 Tío Willy (TVE, 1999)
 Periodistas (Telecinco, 2000)
 Policías (Antena 3, 2001)
 El comisario (Telecinco, 1999 and 2002)
 El Síndrome de Ulises (Antena 3, 2007)
 El vuelo del tren (dir. Paco Torres, 2009)

References

External links
Official site (in Spanish)

1959 births
Actresses from the Canary Islands
Living people
LGBT people from Africa
LGBT legislators in Spain
Spanish LGBT rights activists
People from Tenerife
Transgender actresses
Transgender politicians
Transgender women
Spanish transgender people
Members of the 9th Assembly of Madrid
Members of the 10th Assembly of Madrid
Members of the Socialist Parliamentary Group (Assembly of Madrid)
Members of the 11th Assembly of Madrid
21st-century Spanish LGBT people
Spanish LGBT actors